Wilhelm Löffler (born 7 February 1886) was a German fencer. He competed at the 1912 and 1928 Summer Olympics.

References

1886 births
fencers at the 1912 Summer Olympics
fencers at the 1928 Summer Olympics
German male fencers
Olympic fencers of Germany
year of death missing